Mexican tree frog may refer to:

 Dwarf Mexican tree frog (Tlalocohyla smithii), a frog in the family Hylidae endemic to Mexico
 Mexican burrowing tree frog (Smilisca), a genus of frogs in the family Hylidae found in the Americas
 Common Mexican tree frog (Smilisca baudinii), a species of frog found from southern California to Costa Rica

Animal common name disambiguation pages